Ryan Drummond (born January 10, 1973) is an American actor, voice actor, comedian, singer, clown, mime artist and performer who is best known for his role as the original English voice of Sonic the Hedgehog in the Sonic the Hedgehog video game franchise from 1998 to 2004.

Early life 
Ryan Drummond was born in Lima, Ohio, on January 10, 1973. He attended Clague Middle School in Ann Arbor, Michigan, were he participated in various children's theatre, beginning in 1980 at seven years old. Both of his parents also worked in theatre, his mother and father was both actors and theatre directors of the children theatre plays that Ryan participated in while in school.

In 1993, he got his first paid acting job at a dinner theater while still attending college. He graduated from the Eastern Michigan University in 1995, with a degree in theater. Upon graduating, he moved to San Diego, California in 1996 to pursue his acting career.

Career 
In 1997, Drummond got his first television acting role as DJ Johnny Jam in an episode of the television drama series Baywatch. He would later star in several other television shows, such as Two Guys, a Girl and a Pizza Place, The Chronicle, The Invisible Man, Point Pleasant and Trauma. He also made a guest appearance in an episode on The Rosie O'Donnell Show in December 1998, during the Toys For Tots segment. In film, he made his feature film debut in the 2000 teen cheerleading comedy film, Bring It On as Theatre Boy.

As a voice actor, he has provided many character voices in various video games titles. In 1998, he became the voice of Sonic the Hedgehog in the video games series for SEGA, he continued to voice the character for six more years until 2004, the video games includes Sonic Adventure, Sonic Adventure 2, Sonic Heroes, Sonic Shuffle, Sonic Battle and Sonic Advance 3.

He also voiced Knuckles the Echidna in Sonic Shuffle, Metal Sonic in Sonic Heroes, and has also briefly voiced Shadow the Hedgehog in the Finalhazard boss fight in Sonic Adventure 2, when David Humphrey was unavailable.

Additionally, he also voiced Elliot Ballade in Blue Stinger, Insider in AirBlade, Bill Bardi in The Godfather II, J. Edgar Hoover and various other characters in Call of Cthulhu: Dark Corners of the Earth, Kevin Kertsman in Illbleed and has recently voiced the Doctor character in Mafia: Definitive Edition, where he also did the motion-capture.

Drummond initially wanted to play Sonic in the anime adaptation Sonic X, and even offered to move to New York so he could play the role, 4Kids instead hired Jason Griffith who later became his successor.

In an interview, Drummond stated he was offered the chance by Sega to re-audition as Sonic during the development of Sonic Generations, but he rejected the role because Sega refused to give him a union contract.

He also did voice work in commercials, such as The Padres, McDonald's, Wheel Of Fortune, Sega Dreamcast, Oceans Eleven, Checkmate Inc., Clear Factor Skincare, Hoist Fitness Systems, and Diedrich Coffee. Additionally, he has done voices for theme parks including SeaWorld Orlando as Shamu for a few years and has also provided various voices in Legoland California.

Outside of acting, Drummond has also worked in comedy, such as a mime artist and a clown.

Today, Drummond mainly works in theatre. He starred in a musical comedy theatre show in San Diego titled Forever Plaid. He would later star in many other musical theatre productions, such as Godspell, Into the Woods, City of Angels, Zhivago, The Producers, Hairspray, The Wedding Singer, Anything Goes, Singin' in the Rain, Mary Poppins, Sunday in the Park with George and most recently, Groundhog Day.

Additionally since 2017, he has been the main performer of the theatrical play, Men Are From Mars, Women Are From Venus.

Music career
In 1991, he became a member and the bass vocalist in the music group, The A.Y.U. Quartet. Together, the music group has released three albums.

Personal life 
Upon moving to San Diego, California, Drummond met his wife Lisa. The couple were married on October 8, 2002. Together they have two sons, Daniel and Tommie. As of 2019, the couple have since divorced.  He and his sons currently reside in San Francisco, California.

Drummond would update his fans about his personal life from time to time on his online blog.

Filmography

Film

Television

Video games

Web

Theatre

Discography 
 S.C.R.A.M. (1994) – Harmony, lead vocals
 Atomic Young Ultrasonics (1996) – Harmony, lead vocals
 Acappella Yuletide Uproar (2010) – Harmony, lead vocals

References

External links 
 Official website (archived)
 
 

1973 births
Living people
American male actors
American television actors
American male film actors
American male musical theatre actors
American male stage actors
American male voice actors
American male video game actors
American clowns
21st-century American comedians
20th-century American comedians
American mimes
People from Lima, Ohio
Male actors from Ohio
Eastern Michigan University alumni